Julian Weber (born 29 August 1994) is a German track and field athlete who competes in the javelin throw. He won the European Junior Championship in 2013.

Biography

Weber was born in Mainz on 29 August 1994. He showed early promise as a thrower, but dropped athletics as a 12-year-old to concentrate on handball, the sport of his elder brother Patrick. He returned to the javelin four years later, immediately qualifying for the 2011 German youth championships; coached by Stephan Kallenberg, Weber developed rapidly as a thrower, but quit handball only after injuring himself in a game in 2012. At the 2013 European Junior Championships in Rieti Weber took gold with a fifth-round throw of 79.68 m, a personal best and the best in the world by a junior that year; he narrowly defeated Ukraine's Maksym Bohdan, who also threw beyond the previous world junior leading mark.

Weber broke 80 meters for the first time in 2014 (80.72 m), winning silver behind Thomas Röhler at that year's national championships. In 2015 he improved his best to 81.15 m and placed fifth at the European U23 Championships in Tallinn. Weber reached a new level in 2016, throwing beyond 82 meters in four spring meets; at the national championships he again placed second behind Röhler (with a personal best 83.79 m), but was still left out of the German team for the European Athletics Championships in Amsterdam.

Weber broke his personal best twice more on 29 June 2016 with throws of 84.45 m and 86.83 m at the Paavo Nurmi Games in Turku; the three-meter improvement marked his breakthrough to the world elite, though he was still overshadowed by Röhler, who won the competition with a world-leading 91.28 m and also had a second throw beyond 91 meters. A week and a half later Weber threw 88.04 m in Offenburg, moving him to fourth place on the 2016 world list. He was selected to represent Germany at the 2016 Summer Olympics in Rio de Janeiro, together with Röhler and Johannes Vetter.

Seasonal bests by year

2012 - 71.12 m
2013 - 79.68 m
2014 - 80.72 m
2015 - 81.15 m
2016 - 88.29 m
2017 - 85.85 m
2018 - 86.63 m
2019 - 86.86 m
2021 - 87.03 m
2022 - 89.54 m

References

External links
 
 
 
 
 
 Julian Weber at the Deutscher Leichtathletik Verband 
 Julian Weber, USC Mainz at Leichtathletik-Datenbank.de 

1994 births
Living people
German male javelin throwers
Sportspeople from Mainz
Olympic athletes of Germany
Athletes (track and field) at the 2016 Summer Olympics
Athletes (track and field) at the 2020 Summer Olympics
European Athletics Championships winners